Cingulina imperita is a species of sea snail, a marine gastropod mollusk in the family Pyramidellidae, the pyrams and their allies.

Distribution
This marine species occurs off the eastern coasts of Queensland, one of 5 states and 2 territories of the Australian continent.

References

External links
 World Register of Marine Species

Pyramidellidae
Gastropods described in 1959